Drop the Bomb is a studio album released in 1982 by the Washington, D.C.-based go-go band Trouble Funk. The album included the songs "Drop the Bomb" and "Pump Me Up" which have been sampled numerous times by many hip hop artists.

Track listing

Personnel
 Chester "T-Bone" Davis — electric guitar
 Tony Fisher — lead vocals, bass guitar
 Emmett Nixon — drums
 James Avery — keyboards
 Robert Reed — keyboards
 Mack Carey — percussion, congas
 Timothy "T-Bone" David – percussion, vocals
 David Rudd — saxophone
 Gerald Reed — trombone
 Taylor Reed — trombone, trumpet

References

External links
 
 Drop the Bomb at Discogs.com

1982 albums
Trouble Funk albums
Sugar Hill Records (hip hop label) albums